Weaste is a tram stop on the Eccles Line of Greater Manchester's light rail Metrolink system. It opened to passengers on 12 June 1999 as part of Phase 2 of the network's expansion, and is located the Weaste area of the City of Salford, in North West England.

Weaste tram stop is close to the M602 motorway and The Willows, the former home stadium of Salford City Reds.

Services

Service pattern
12 minute service to Ashton-under-Lyne (via MediaCityUK at offpeak times).
12 minute service to Eccles.

Connecting bus routes
Weaste station is served by Go North West service 33, which runs between Manchester Shudehill and Worsley via Eccles

References

External links
Weaste Stop Information
Weaste area map

Tram stops in Salford
Tram stops on the Eccles to Piccadilly line